Stevče Alušovski (born 1 October 1972) is a retired Macedonian-Australian handball player and current coach of Þór Akureyri.

Career
Stevče Alušovski was born in Sydney, Australia, but in his early childhood, he returned to Bitola with his family.
His handball career began in Bitola, in the youth team of RK Pelister. At the age of 17, in the 1990/1991 season, he became a first team member at Bitola club.
During his career, he played for: RK Pelister, RK Prespa, RK Vardar PRO and RK Metalurg Skopje.

He has won the Macedonian First League of Handball 13 times and the Macedonian Handball Cup 11 times.

In 2004, he was proclaimed for the best handball player in Macedonia.

For the Macedonian national handball team, he played more than 200 matches and scored more than 900 goals. 
In 2009, he was a member of the team which finished 11th on the 2009 World Men's Handball Championship. Three years later, he played on the 2012 European Men's Handball Championship when they finished 5th.

References

1972 births
Macedonian male handball players
Living people
Sportspeople from Bitola
Sportspeople from Sydney
Australian emigrants to North Macedonia
Australian people of Macedonian descent
RK Vardar players